Paper Orchid is a 1948 crime novel by the British writer Arthur La Bern. He had made his name three years earlier with It Always Rains on Sunday and also enjoyed success with this novel set amongst newspaper journalists on Fleet Street.

Film adaptation
It was adapted into a 1949 film of the same title directed by Roy Ward Baker and starring Hugh Williams and Hy Hazell.

References

Bibliography
 Goble, Alan. The Complete Index to Literary Sources in Film. Walter de Gruyter, 1999.
 Mayer, Geoff. Roy Ward Baker. Manchester University Press, 2004.
 Reilly, John M. Twentieth Century Crime & Mystery Writers. Springer, 2015.

1948 British novels
Novels by Arthur La Bern
British crime novels
British thriller novels
British novels adapted into films
Novels set in London
Novels about journalism